Edvin Hellgren (11 May 1888 – 25 February 1919) was a Swedish athlete. He competed in the men's individual cross country event at the 1912 Summer Olympics.

References

External links
 

1888 births
1919 deaths
Athletes (track and field) at the 1912 Summer Olympics
Swedish male long-distance runners
Olympic athletes of Sweden
Athletes from Stockholm
Olympic cross country runners
20th-century Swedish people